Kristen Brunkow O'Shea (born July 10, 1992) is an American politician in the Kansas Senate from the 18th district. She assumed office in 2021. Her district is anchored in northern Topeka, and also includes the cities of Silver Lake, Rossvile, St. Marys and Wamego.

References

External links
Vote Smart Kristen O'Shea

1992 births
Living people
Republican Party Kansas state senators
21st-century American politicians
21st-century American women politicians
Women state legislators in Kansas
University of Missouri alumni
Kansas State University alumni